Andrew Rantzen is a Sydney-based lo-fi electronic recording artist  and writer.   Trained as a psychologist, he has been lecturer and tutor at the University of Sydney.  He is most well known as part of the duo
Itch-E and Scratch-E along with Paul Mac (Boo Boo & Mace is another alias for the same duo).
He has produced remixes for Severed Heads, INXS and The Wiggles, and has done soundtrack work for the film Sample People. 
He also records with the Pelican Daughters. In 2001 he released his first solo LP, The Blue Hour.

References

External links
Discography from discogs.com
Pelican Daughters
Information on Rantzen from a Polish site

Musicians from Sydney
Writers from Sydney
Living people
Year of birth missing (living people)